Meserve Glacier is a hanging glacier on the south wall of Wright Valley, in the Asgard Range of Victoria Land, Antarctica, between Bartley Glacier and Hart Glacier. It was named by U.S. geologist Robert Nichols for William Meserve, a geological assistant to Nichols in Wright Valley in the 1959–60 field season.

References

Glaciers of the Asgard Range
McMurdo Dry Valleys